Shad Neshin (also Romanized as Shād Neshīn; also known as Shāh Neshīn) is a village in Chubar Rural District, Ahmadsargurab District, Shaft County, Gilan Province, Iran.

Demographics
At the 2006 census, its population was 309, in 84 families.

References 

Populated places in Shaft County
Shaft County